Jarrold is a surname. Notable people with the surname include:

 Ernest Jarrold (1848–1912), American author
 Julian Jarrold (born 1960), English film and television director
 Ken Jarrold (born 1948), British health service manager